Daguessa is a town in the Sila Region of eastern Chad, on Chad's border with Sudan. 

Prior to 2008 it was located in the former Sila Department of the Ouaddaï Region.

The town was involved in the Darfur conflict. On November 29, 2006, villages in the Daguessa area were attacked by armed men on horseback who stole the villagers' cattle.

Transport
The town is served by Daguessa Airport.

References

External links
 BBC

Populated places in Chad
Chad–Sudan border crossings
Sila Region